The following lists events that happened during 1885 in New Zealand.

Incumbents

Regal and viceregal
Head of State – Queen Victoria
Governor – Lieutenant-General Sir William Jervois.

Government and law
The 9th New Zealand Parliament continues.

Speaker of the House – Maurice O'Rorke.
Premier – Robert Stout
Minister of Finance – Julius Vogel
Chief Justice – Hon Sir James Prendergast

Main centre leaders
Mayor of Auckland – William Waddel
Mayor of Christchurch – Charles Hulbert
Mayor of Dunedin – Arthur Scoular followed by John Barnes
Mayor of Wellington – George Fisher

Events
1 June: The Cambridge News starts publication. It is produced three times a week. The newspaper closed in 1889.
1 August: The New Zealand Industrial Exhibition opens in Wellington

Undated
 Closure of St Peter's School, Auckland, Auckland's first Catholic boys' secondary school.

Sport

Horse racing
New Zealand Cup winner: Fusilade
New Zealand Derby winner: Stonyhurst
Auckland Cup winner: Nelson (Australian owned)
Wellington Cup winner: Mahaki

see also :Category:Horse racing in New Zealand.

Rowing
The Wellington Rowing Club is formed in Wellington.

Rugby union
The Nelson union is formed. It is now part of the Tasman Rugby Union.

Provincial club rugby champions include: 
see also :Category:Rugby union in New Zealand

Shooting
Ballinger Belt: Lieutenant Lucas (Thames)

Births
 24 February: Charles Cotton, geologist.
 8 September: Robert Laidlaw, businessman.

Deaths
 12 June: John Sheehan, politician.
Full date unknown:
 William John Larkin, New Zealand priest, Irish nationalist and newspaper proprietor

See also
List of years in New Zealand
Timeline of New Zealand history
History of New Zealand
Military history of New Zealand
Timeline of the New Zealand environment
Timeline of New Zealand's links with Antarctica

References
General
 Romanos, J. (2001) New Zealand Sporting Records and Lists. Auckland: Hodder Moa Beckett. 
Specific

External links